Janine Lambertine Marie Angele De Greef (born 25 September 1925, Etterbeek – died 7 November 2020) was a member of the Comet Line in the Belgian Resistance during the Second World War. Together with her mother, Elvire De Greef, and her brother, she helped exfiltrate Allied combatants from occupied Belgium through France to Spain.

Biography
De Greef's father was a businessman, while her mother worked for the newspaper L'Indépendance Belge. She was a schoolgirl in Etterbeek when Nazi forces entered Belgium in 1940. The family escaped to Biarritz, and took up residence in Anglet, a small village nearby.

In 1941, De Greef's parents set up the southern part of the Comet Line with Andrée de Jongh, creating escape routes over the Pyrenees and links with British officials in Spain. Her father worked as an interpreter for the German occupation, through which he was able to get documentation for evacuees and soldiers. Her brother, an artist, forged official stamps.

Janine De Greef's first assignment was on 15 October 1941, which she recorded in her diary. She picked up two airmen, who left the following day. She would escort her charges from Paris to Anglet by train, her youthfulness helping to evade suspicion. She would then take them to a safe house close to the Spanish border, the most dangerous part of the journey, handing them over to Basque guides. They used so many bicycles in this last route that their disposal became a big worry.

De Greef's diary was written in a mixture of shorthand, French and English.

By 1944, the northern escape route of the Comet Line had been disrupted by the Germans, and the southern part was in peril. The De Greef family used the route to reach San Sebastián in Spain, from where they were moved to England.

After the war, Janine De Greef was awarded the British King's Medal for Courage in the Cause of Freedom, the US Medal of Freedom, as well as French and Belgian gallantry medals. She returned to Brussels to work as a commercial attaché at the British Embassy. After her mother's death in 1991, she moved into her flat, which was later destroyed in a fire.

De Greef maintained an archive of war memorabilia as well as the family records of the Comet Line. These little black books were stolen from her.

Janine De Greef died on 7 November 2020.

References 

Women in World War II
Belgian people of World War II
Female resistance members of World War II
1925 births
2020 deaths
Belgian resistance members
People from Brussels
Recipients of the King's Medal for Courage in the Cause of Freedom
Recipients of the Medal of Freedom